DPCA may refer to:

 Democratic Party Committee Abroad, the official organization of the Democratic Party for United States citizens living abroad
 Dicalcium phosphate, the calcium phosphate with the formula CaHPO4 and its dihydrate, also called dibasic calcium phosphate anhydrous (DCPA)
 Dongfeng Peugeot-Citroën Automobile, a joint venture between Dongfeng Motor Corporation and Groupe PSA